Amara Louise Wilson Ruth (born 25 May 1985) is a Costa Rican former footballer who played as a forward. She has been a member of the Costa Rica women's national team.

Early life
Wilson was raised in Escazú, San José Province.

International goals
Scores and results list Costa Rica's goal tally first

References

1985 births
Living people
Women's association football forwards
Costa Rican women's footballers
People from Guanacaste Province
People from Escazú (canton)
Costa Rica women's international footballers
Colorado College Tigers women's soccer players
Costa Rican expatriate footballers
Costa Rican expatriate sportspeople in the United States
Expatriate women's soccer players in the United States